Tony Weare (1 January 1912 – 2 December 1994) was an English comics artist best known for drawing Matt Marriott, a daily Western strip written by Jim Edgar, which ran in The Evening News from 1955 to 1977.

Tony Weare was born at Wincanton, Somerset,  and studied drawing at the Bournemouth School of Art but became a trooper in a cavalry regiment where he developed a love of horses. As well as Matt Marriott, he also worked at Mickey Mouse Weekly, where he worked on "Billy Brave", "Pride of the Circus", "Savage Splendour", and "Robin Alone". He illustrated "The Colditz Story" for Junior Express and was voted Serious Strip Cartoonist of the Year, 1961. In the 1980s he drew "Rookwood" for Look and Learn magazine and a few sequences in Alan Moore and David Lloyd's V for Vendetta, at the invitation of Lloyd, an admirer of his work.

David Lloyd wrote about him:

References

External links
 Tony Weare at Lambiek.net
 The Cartoon Stripped
 A Matt Marriott strip from ca. 1960 — go to www.art4comics.com/comicstripart.htm and look for Weare in the index.

1912 births
1994 deaths
People from Wincanton
English comics artists
Alumni of Arts University Bournemouth